Ken McNaught (born 11 January 1955) is a Scottish former footballer who played for Aston Villa from 1977–1983 and was part of their Championship winning side of 1981, European Cup victory in 1982 and won the European Super Cup in 1983 against Barcelona, scoring one of Villa's goals in the latter final. 
McNaught's father was Scottish international footballer Willie McNaught.

Background

Willie McNaught, originally from Dumfries, was on his service during World War II when he was spotted by a Raith Rovers official who promptly offered to sign him. McNaught senior as such relocated to Kirkcaldy (and went on to break the club appearances record); It was here that Ken McNaught was born in 1955.

Everton

Clearly inheriting the talents of his internationalist father, Ken McNaught was signed by Everton as an apprentice. His league debut came in 1974–75 and he went to make 66 league appearances for the Toffees over the next three seasons. He played for Everton against Aston Villa in the 1977 League Cup Final, a contest that went to two replays. McNaught played in all three games and collected a runners up medal.

Aston Villa

After impressing in the final against Villa he was signed by the Birmingham club in the 1977 close-season. He was 22 at the time. It was at Villa where McNaught's career reached its zenith with silverware in the League, European Cup and European Super Cup in which he scored against Barcelona.

Later career

McNaught spent a season at West Bromwich Albion where he was a first team regular playing in 42 league games. The season after he was loaned out to Manchester City, 1984–85 season, where he made seven league appearances. His last season was with Sheffield United where he played 34 league games. He was then forced to retire early.

International
Unlike his father who won five full Scotland caps, Ken McNaught never played for Scotland. He and John McGovern are the only two Scots to win UEFA's premier club competition to never be given a full cap.

Honours
Everton
 League Cup runner-up: 1976–77

Aston Villa
 Football League First Division: 1980–81
 FA Charity Shield: 1981 (shared) 
 European Cup: 1981–82
 European Super Cup: 1982
 Intercontinental Cup runner-up: 1982

References

External links
Sporting Heroes.net

1955 births
Living people
Footballers from Kirkcaldy
Scottish footballers
Association football defenders
Everton F.C. players
Aston Villa F.C. players
West Bromwich Albion F.C. players
Manchester City F.C. players
Sheffield United F.C. players
English Football League players